William Maximillian Griggs (September 1938 – 8 July 2021) was the president of the R Griggs Group, owner of the Dr. Martens shoe company, and one of the largest shoe manufacturers in the United Kingdom. In 2002, the company ceased production in the United Kingdom and began outsourcing to China and Thailand.

According to the Sunday Times Rich List in 2019, Griggs and his son Stephen were worth £264 million.

The Dr Martens boots (nicknamed DMs), having been manufactured in England since 1960, were most popular in the 1980s, but in the following decade, their popularity started to decline.

In 1992 Max Griggs bought Rushden Town and Irthlingborough Diamonds football clubs. He merged them into one as  Rushden & Diamonds football club, which enjoyed league status for a time. One of the stands in the club's ground was called the Airwair stand (a type of DM shoe).

Max Griggs sold the club to the fans in 2005 for £1. The club went into administration six years later.

He died on 8 July 2021, aged 82.

References

External links
 BBC - Griggs hands over Diamonds
 Scotland on Sunday - Even well-heeled can't ensure Diamonds are for ever

English football chairmen and investors
1938 births
2021 deaths
Place of birth missing
Rushden & Diamonds F.C.